The Port of Yangpu is a seaport located within the Yangpu Economic Development Zone, Yangpu Peninsula, Hainan, China.

It has 25 berths with 15 shipping lines to Singapore, Vietnam and the Middle East, and is the biggest import and export port in the South China Sea. It is operated by SDIC Yangpu Ltd.

References

External links
 
 Website

Ports and harbours of Hainan